Lorenzo D'Anna (born 29 January 1972) is an Italian football manager and former player, last in charge as head coach of Serie C club Trento.

Playing career
D'Anna was a centre back, and was the captain of A.C. ChievoVerona of Serie A, with over 300 matches played for the flying donkeys. He played for Chievo from 1994 to 2007.

Before joining Chievo, D'Anna also played for Como, Pro Sesto and Fiorentina.

Coaching career
On 9 July 2013 he was appointed manager of Südtirol in Lega Pro Prima Divisione; and sacked the next October.

On 29 April 2018, he was promoted as head coach of Chievo after the sacking of Rolando Maran.

On 27 March 2022, D'Anna returned to management as the new head coach of Serie C club Trento. After completing the season and saving the club from relegation, he was confirmed in charge of the club for the 2022–23 season, but was sacked on 9 October 2022 due to negative results.

References

External links

1972 births
Living people
Sportspeople from the Province of Lecco
Italian footballers
Association football central defenders
Como 1907 players
ACF Fiorentina players
A.C. ChievoVerona players
S.S.D. Pro Sesto players
Piacenza Calcio 1919 players
Treviso F.B.C. 1993 players
Serie A players
Serie B players
F.C. Südtirol managers
A.C. ChievoVerona managers
Serie A managers
Serie C managers
Italian football managers
Footballers from Lombardy